Baykitsky District  was a former district (raion), one of the three in the former Evenk Autonomous Okrug, which was merged into Krasnoyarsk Krai on 1 January 2007.

Location 

Baykitsky district was located in the south-western area of the Evenk Autonomous Okrug. The district shared borders with (clockwise from the north) Ilimpiyskiy and Tungussko-Chunsky districts within the Evenk AO, and Boguchansky, Motyginsky, Severo-Yeniseysky, Yeniseysky, and Turukhansky districts of Krasnoyarsk Krai. The total area of the district was 102,000 km2 and the administrative centre was the town of Baykit.

Geography 

The district was located in the Central Siberian Plateau, around 500–600 metres above sea level, in the middle course of the Podkamennaya Tunguska river – its confluence with the Baikitik can be found in the former area of the district. The highest point of the district was Onot Mountain at 787 metres.

History 

Baykitsky district was created in 1927, three years before the creation of Evenk AO. The district was abolished upon the merger of Evenk AO and Krasnoyarsk Krai, on 1 January 2007. It now forms the south-western area of Evenkiysky District.

Economy

Infrastructure 

The district was the centre of industrial development in Evenkia. Within its territory, there were many gas and oil fields, such as Yurubchenko-Tokhomskoye, Kuyumbinskoye and Omorinskoye. The East Siberian Oil Company, the majority of which was formerly owned by Yukos, is currently actively developing the Yurubchenko-Tokhomskoye field.

Not far away from the oil field is an oil refinery with a maximum capacity of 40,000 tons of oil per year. The development of the field and refinery put an end to the energy problems in Baykitsky district.

Logging 

There is a small timber processing industry in the area. Currently it only produces small volumes of timber – only around 10–15 thousand tons of wood. This figure is planned to be increased in the future, going up to 50,000 or possibly 100,000 tons, so that all of Evenkiysky District can be supplied with wood rather than just the former Baykitsky district, and possibly later supplying other regions.

Reindeer herding 

In the past, reindeer herding was well-developed in the area. In just the village of Surinda, there were roughly 15,000 reindeer, and in the village of Poligus, there were up to 10,000. However, in recent years the figure has fallen drastically and the total number of reindeer in the former district has fallen to well under 2,000.

Livestock and other foods 

Some people in the settlements of the former district use livestock and gardening as their occupation. As well as this, fishing and hunting are popular activities in the district, all of which made the district relatively self-sufficient in its needs.

Demographics

Settlements 

Baykitsky district contained 11 settlements, 2 of which are abandoned (postal codes in brackets):

 The town of Baykit (648360) – population 3,343
 The village of Burnyy (648367) – population 194
 The village of Kuyumba (648373) – population 166
 The village of Kuzmovka (648369) – population 193
 The village of Miryuga (648365) – population 43
 The village of Osharovo (648364) – population 96
 The village of Poligus (648371) – population 242
 The village of Sulomay (648368) – population 178
 The village of Surinda (648372) – population 435
 The village of Taimba – abandoned since 2016
 The village of Ust'-Kamo – abandoned since 2016

Population 

The population of the town and 9 inhabited settlements of the former district (since 1939) were:

 1939: 3,372
 1959: 2,843
 1970: 3,349
 1979: 4,466
 1989: 6,939
 2002: 5,819
 2010: 5,336

References 

Districts of Krasnoyarsk Krai
Evenk Autonomous Okrug
States and territories established in 1927